Washington Week—previously Washington Week in Review—is an American public affairs television program, which has aired on PBS and its predecessor, National Educational Television, since 1967. Unlike other panel discussion shows which encourage informal (sometimes vociferous) debates as a means of presentation, Washington Week consistently follows a path of civility and moderation. Its format is that of a roundtable featuring the show's moderator between two and four Washington-based journalists. The show has been moderated by Yamiche Alcindor since 2021.

Background
Washington Week in Review was first broadcast on February 23, 1967, on NET and was picked up by PBS in 1970. Since moving to PBS, Washington Week has used a panel discussion format moderated by a host. Washington Week is on PBS's national primetime lineup. Because of the subscriber nature of PBS, local presentation of Washington Week is scheduled by individual stations, and air times vary by market. The most common airing pattern is the show leading off primetime on Friday evenings with weekend afternoon encores on most PBS member stations, and several airings per week on the affiliated network, World Channel. The program is produced by WETA-TV in Washington, D.C.

In 2006, Washington Week made an agreement with National Journal which ensured that at least one National Journal reporter would be on the show. This agreement is no longer in effect. Panelists come from various national media organizations.

On January 8, 2010, Washington Week began broadcasting in high definition, with broadcasts presented in a letterboxed format for viewers with standard-definition television sets watching either through cable or satellite television. The program also introduced a new set and upconverted its existing graphics package to HD.

Gwen Ifill was the host from the time Ken Bode was fired in 1999 until her death on November 14, 2016. A successor was not announced immediately. It was Ifill who shortened the name of the program when she took over, as a sign that "the show would spend more time looking forward." On April 20, 2017, WETA announced that Robert Costa of The Washington Post would become the next moderator of Washington Week. Costa left the program in January 2021 to devote his time to co-authoring an upcoming book with veteran journalist Bob Woodward; guest moderators were used in Costa's place.

In May 2021, Yamiche Alcindor, at the time the White House correspondent for PBS NewsHour, became the ninth moderator of Washington Week. Alcindor had previously been a regular Washington Week panelist. In December 2021, WETA subsidiary NewsHour Productions began producing Washington Week. In February 2023, Alcindor announced that she would step down to focus full-time on her job at NBC and writing her memoirs, saying that her final date as moderator would be February 24.

Since its first episode in 1967, the program's announcer has been Paul Anthony.

Notable personalities

Moderators
 1967-1968: John Davenport
 1968-1969: Lincoln Furber
 1969–1971: Max Kampelman
 1971–1974: Robert MacNeil
 1974–1994: Paul Duke
 1994–1999: Ken Bode
 1999–2016: Gwen Ifill 
 2016–2017: Amy Walter (interim moderator)
 2017–2021: Robert Costa
 2021–2023: Yamiche Alcindor

Regular panelists

 Peter Baker
 Molly Ball
 Dan Balz
 Jeffrey Birnbaum
 Gloria Borger
 Michael Crowley (journalist)
 Jeanne Cummings
 Lisa Desjardins
 John Dickerson
 Major Garrett
 Georgie Anne Geyer
 John Harwood
 Carl Hulse
 Haynes Johnson
 Katty Kay
 Indira A.R. Lakshmanan
 Mark Landler
 Mara Liasson
 Peter Lisagor
 Neil MacNeil
 Charley McDowell
 Jonathan Martin
 Doyle McManus
 Amna Nawaz
 Jack Nelson
 Susan Page
 Martha Raddatz
 Philip Rucker
 Stephanie Ruhle
 Vivian Salama
 David Sanger
 Jake Sherman
 Alexis Simendinger
 Hedrick Smith
 Kayla Tausche
 Karen Tumulty
 Amy Walter
 Pete Williams
 Nancy Youssef
 Janine Zacharia

See also
 Inside Washington
 Agronsky & Co.
 Gordon Peterson

Reception 
Washington Week has received generally positive reviews from television critics. Barry Garron of Current wrote, "Favor[s] balance over frivolity."

References

External links
 
 
 https://www.youtube.com/user/washingtonweekGI/videos
 http://feeds.pbs.org/pbs/weta/washingtonweek-audio
 http://feeds.pbs.org/pbs/weta/washingtonweek-video

PBS original programming
National Educational Television original programming
1967 American television series debuts
1970s American television series
1980s American television news shows
1990s American television news shows
2000s American television news shows
2010s American television news shows
2020s American television news shows
English-language television shows
Culture of Washington, D.C.
Current affairs shows
Peabody Award-winning television programs